The PTBC Storm English Open is one of the Europe's leading Ten-pin bowling tournaments. It was formed by the Premier Tenpin Bowling Club under the BTBA. In 2007 it forms part of the European Bowling Tour, and following the cancellation of the Kungsbacka International tournament in Sweden, becomes the final tournament in the calendar.

The inaugural PTBC Storm English Open was put together in 2006 by the PTBC to essentially replace the loss of the British Open. The PTBC's intention is for the tournament to grow to a level that will compete with some of the largest amateur tournaments outside of the United States. The tournament was won by Paul Moor of England.

The 2007 Tournament

The 2007 English Open will take place from the 5th to 9 December, and is the 18th and final stop in the 2007 European Bowling Tour (EBT). It is an EBT Challenger event, offering normal EBT ranking points for the top 50 Men and top 50 Women. The tournament is also a British ranking event to determine the selection of bowlers to represent Team GB during 2008, and it will also be the third and final tour stop of the Storm Rolling Thunder Tour.

Lane maintenance will be provided by kegel.

The venue will be at the Lakeside Superbowl in Nuneaton, Warwickshire. This town will provide the PTBC with an excellent range of facilities due to our close working relationship directly with the bowl. With plenty of room behind the lanes, an impeccably clean centre and a highly rated pro-shop onsite it's no wonder Nuneaton is a regular on the UK tournament calendar.

Located in the Bermuda Park retail centre, there are plenty of fast food outlets and restaurants, an 8 screen cinema and a hotel on-site. You shouldn't need to venture far from the action, but should you wish to explore whilst you are here there are plenty of tourist attractions all within easy reach.

Tournament Format

The tournament is an open mixed singles event, with women receiving a handicap of 8 pins per game. Professional Bowlers are eligible for entry. There are 16 qualification squads, plus a desperado squad.

Qualification
Qualifying will consist of 6 games
Re-entries will consist of 6 games

The top 44 players will qualify for the following final steps:
- Players in positions 1-2 will qualify to the final step 5
- Players in positions 3-6 will qualify to the final step 4
- Players in positions 7-10 will qualify to the final step 3
- Players in positions 11-44 will qualify for the final step 1

Desperado squad
A 1-game shootout
Players in positions 1-4 will qualify for the final step 1

Final step 1
38 players will play 6 games starting from scratch
Top 24 will continue to the final step 2
The remaining 14 players will be ranked 35-48 according to their positions in the final step 1

Final step 2
24 players will play 3 games with the pin fall from the final step 1 carried forward
Top 12 will continue to the Final step 3
The remaining 12 players will be ranked 23-34 according to their positions in the final step 2

Seeding and matching in the final step 3-7
Players in positions 1-10 from the qualification will be seeded 1-10
Players in positions 1-12 from the final step 2 will be seeded 11-22

In each of the matches in the final step 3-7, the highest seeded player will meet the lowest seeded player,
the second highest seeded player will meet the second lowest seeded player etc.

Final step 3
16 players will play 8 matches, best of three games
The 8 winners will continue to the final step 4
The 8 losers will be ranked 15-22 according to their seeding

Final step 4
12 players will play 6 matches, best of three games
The 6 winners will continue to the final step 5
The 6 losers will be ranked 9-14 according to their seeding

Final step 5
8 players will play 4 matches, best of three games
The 4 winners will continue to the final step 6
The 4 losers will be ranked 5-8 according to their seeding

Final step 6
4 players will play 2 matches, best of three games
The 2 winners will continue to the final step 7
The 2 losers will be ranked 3-4 according to their seeding

Final step 7
2 players will play 1 match, best of three games
The winner will be ranked 1
The loser will be ranked 2

Prize Fund

All prizes quoted are in UK£ sterling

External links
Official PTBC website
Official BTBA website
What is the BTBA?
Official BTBA Forum
Bowlinglinks all over the World, sorted by categories

Ten-pin bowling competitions
Sport in England
Tenpin bowling in the United Kingdom